Dutch John Creek is a  long 2nd order tributary to the Yadkin River in Montgomery County, North Carolina.

Course
Dutch John Creek rises on the divide of an unnamed tributary to the Yadkin River in Montgomery County about 2 miles north of Falls Mountain.  Dutch John Creek then takes a southerly course to join the Yadkin River about 4 miles southeast of Badin, North Carolina.

Watershed
Dutch John Creek drains  of area, receives about 48.1 in/year of precipitation, has a wetness index of 279.86 and is about 98% forested.

References

Rivers of North Carolina
Bodies of water of Montgomery County, North Carolina